Bangladesh Air Force Shaheen College, or BAF Shaheen College, is a privatised educational institution run by the Bangladesh Air Force in different airbases around Bangladesh. It has the largest primary, secondary and higher secondary student population in Bangladesh.

Colleges
There are seven Shaheen colleges and a Shaheen English medium school that are operated by the Bangladesh Air Force situated near airbases in Bangladesh.

BAF Shaheen College Dhaka

The college was established on 1 March 1960. The college is co-educational. There are 6000 students and 125 teaching staff.

Administration
There are four parts to the institution,
 Primary and secondary Bangla and English version school (pre-school to year 12)
 College (year 11 and 12)
 Undergraduate program
Each section is independent and has separate facilities and faculties. The sections are administered under their own vice principals (education) supervised by the principal. The Disciplinary administration is controlled by an adjutant, with comparable salary and privileges of a vice principal. From a purely administrative point of view, the adjutant has the office of the vice principal.

Faculty
 Principal – Group Captain A K M Abdur Razzaque (February2023)
 Vice Principal (College) – Sukumar Chandra Saha
 Vice Principal (School) – Farida Yasmin
 Adjutant – Squadron Leader Niaz Mohammad Chapal

Programmes
The Bangla Medium School awards the nationally recognised Secondary School Certification (comparable to year 10 graduation). Similarly, the College Section awards the Higher Secondary Certification (comparable to year 12 graduation).
Like the Bangla medium section, English version awards the nationally recognised Secondary School Certification (comparable to year 10 graduation).
The undergraduate programme leads to a first degree with honours in general sciences, commerce, the arts or social sciences. All degree programmes are recognised by the National University.

BAF Shaheen College Kurmitola

BAF Shaheen College Kurmitola was established in 1972 as 'BAF High School'. The school was renamed as 'BAF Shaheen School' in 1980. Higher Secondary School Certificate course was introduced in the school from 1982 and then it was named as 'BAF Shaheen School and College'. In 1986 it was again renamed as 'BAF Shaheen College Kurmitola'. Students are taught from KG to XII classes in a coeducation environment.

"Education, Restraint and Discipline" is the school motto. There are 55 sections from KG to XII classes. The college has 7,500 students, and 180 teaching and 65 non-teaching staff. The college is managed by the Bangladesh Air Force.

About 7,500 students study there in 111 sections. BAF Shaheen College Kurmitola has both Bangla medium and English Version school and college. There is a Science Group, Business Study Group, Arts Group, a Library, debating club, Girls Guide, Quiz Club, B.N.C.C. unit along with different cultural houses.
 Principal: Group Captain Md. Jahangir Alam Talukder
 Vice principal: Mehrab Hossain Himel
 College adjutant: Mazharul Islam

BAF Shaheen College Bogura 
BAF Shaheen College Bogura is a privatized educational institution run by the Bangladesh Air Force.The inaugural ceremony of BAF Shaheen College Bogura was held on 1 January 2020 and the youngest of BAF Shaheen College Family.
Chief of Air Staff Air Chief Marshal Masihuzzaman Serniabat attended the inauguration programme as chief guest and unveiled the plaque of the newly constructed building of the institute and inaugurated academic activities of the institute. Under the annual development program of the Government of the People's Republic of Bangladesh, the infrastructure of the college was constructed.
Around 1,900 Students can take education from KG class to the twelfth grade, the students will have the opportunity to receive quality education in the college with modern facilities. It is expected that the newly created educational institute will be able to contribute significantly to the eradication of illiteracy, poverty alleviation, socio-economic development and sustainable development of the country.

BAF Shaheen College Shamshernagar
BAF Shaheen College Shamshernagar is a glorious and traditional institute in the country. It was established in 2011 with 1000 students in 6 classes from KG to class VI. The school opened a new class every year up to XII in 2013. The school has preliminary permission from the education board in Sylhet to run the education activities of classes VI to XII. It is now a college. About 2118 students study there in 48 sections. BAF Shaheen College Shamshernagar is a Bangla medium school and college. There is a Science Group, Business Study Group, Arts Group, a Library, Debating club, Programming Club, English Language Club, Girls Guide, Quiz Club, B.N.C.C. unit. The aim of this college is to build students as educated, honest, healthy, patriot and ideal citizens side by side with their studies. "Education-perseverance-Discipline" is the motto of this college.

BAF Shaheen College Chittagong

BAF Shaheen College Chittagong is a glorious and traditional institute in the country. It was established in 1978 by Bangladesh Air Force as per the rules and regulations of Ministry of Education of the Government of People's Republic of Bangladesh and Secondary Education Board Chittagong. This school was upgraded to Higher Secondary from the session 1985–86. From the year 2006 English curriculum under NCTB has been introduced as one section each of the classes from II to V along with the existing Bangla curriculum. The aim of this college is to build students as educated, honest, healthy, patriot and ideal citizens side by side with their studies. "Education-perseverance-Discipline" is the motto of this college. Many of its students have made their entry into different successful professions in Bangladesh and abroad. Most of the time it keeps its position into top 10 schools and college on the basis of board exam results.

BAF Shaheen College Jashore

On 26 January 1976, the foundation was laid in Jessore for what was then called Satadal School. Three years later it was renamed BAF Shaheen School. It was upgraded to a college (up to class XII) in 1984.

BAF Shaheen College PaharKanchanPur (PKP)
BAF Shaheen School, PKP began in 1997 with 51 students in three classes from KG to class II. The school opened a new class every year up to class VIII in 2003. The school has preliminary permission from the education board in Dhaka to run the education activities of classes VI to VIII. Now it teaches until higher secondary. In 2014, the first batch attend to HSC examination under Dhaka education board.

BAF Shaheen English Medium School, Dhaka (SEMS)
BAF Shaheen English Medium School, or commonly known as BAF SEMS - is a school in Dhaka Cantonment, Dhaka, Bangladesh. Its education is based on Cambridge International Examinations of UK under the direct supervision of the Bangladesh Air Force. From the year 1998, BAF SEMS' students have started sitting for the O’Level exam under University of London.

Gallery

References

External links 
 Official website of BAF Shaheen College Kurmitola
 Official website of BAF Shaheen College Shamshernagar
 Official Website of BAF Shaheen College Dhaka
 https://web.archive.org/web/20150710043803/http://www.baf.mil.bd/new/bafschool/bafscctgl.html

Bangladesh Air Force
Universities and colleges in Dhaka
Schools in Dhaka District
Colleges in Bangladesh
1960 establishments in East Pakistan
Educational institutions established in 1960